WNYN-LD, virtual channel 39 (UHF digital channel 30), is a low-powered COMFY-TV licensed to New York City, New York, United States. The station is owned by TVC Television, with its transmitter located atop the Citibank Building in Long Island City, Queens.

History

As W51BV
The station started out as W51BV channel 51 on July 19, 1991 as an affiliate of The Box Music Network licensed to Deer Park.

As WNYN-LP
On November 20, 1995, the station became WNYN-LP. In 2000, they ceased operations on channel 51 without warning, leaving many fans of The Box in the area in the dark. During this time, WNYN prepared to move to channel 39, while its sister station WXNY-LP, who at the time was on channel 39, prepared to move to channel 32.

One Sunday night in 2001, channel 51 came back on the air for one night with the LTV programming that also aired on WXNY-LP, but there was no audio. It is believed that this was WNYN's way of preventing their license from being revoked by the FCC for being silent for more than 12 consecutive months.

In 2002, WNYN-LP moved to channel 39 and became an affiliate of Azteca América, after the network earlier failed to acquire WSAH, which they intended to use as New York's Azteca América flagship.

As WNYN-LD
On June 12, 2009, analog transmission for full-powered stations ceased and digital transmission began. Azteca America moved to WMBC-TV (channel 63)'s sixth subchannel in 2010. WNYN concurrently switched to an independent station with a station logo which shows an overnight view of the New York City skyline with a new station branding called TVC 39. WNYN airs movies along with music videos plus general programming. WNYN is currently airing infomercials and is one of three affiliates that might join MundoFox in 2012, but it was picked up by WPXO-LD which has since ceased CaribeVision in 2012. Later that year they have found another affiliate which is TeLe-Romántica, thus replacing independent programming, which since the transition has been seen on 39.2 and 39.5 in both English and Spanish programming. As a result of the switch www.furiamusicaltv.com has since discontinued streaming programming. The website has since returned in 2013, airing infomercials in Spanish plus local programming. The website was discontinued around 2015, the next year Azteca America returned back on WNYN-LD for the first time in 6 years. Three years later in 2019, it became an all sports format of BeIN Sports Xtra after Azteca America moved to WKOB-LD. In 2022 BeIN Sports was dropped, reverting back to a general entertainment English format of COMFY-TV for the first time in 22 years.

Digital television
The station's digital signal is multiplexed:

The station moved to channel 30, shared with WNJJ-LD, as the result of a channel sharing agreement implemented to resolve a displacement conflict in August 2019.

References

External links
 

1991 establishments in New York (state)
Low-power television stations in the United States
NYN-LD
Television channels and stations established in 1991
NYN-LD